Aaj Ka Hindustan is a 1940 Bollywood film directed by Jayant Desai and starring Rose, Prithviraj Kapoor, Ishwarlal, Sitara Devi and comedian Charlie. It was produced by Movietone. The film is the story of two brothers – one a nationalist (Prithviraj).

References

External links
 

1940 films
1940s Hindi-language films
Indian black-and-white films
Films directed by Jayant Desai